In finance, subprime lending (also referred to as near-prime, subpar, non-prime, and second-chance lending) is the provision of loans to people in the United States who may have difficulty maintaining the repayment schedule. Historically, subprime borrowers were defined as having FICO scores below 600, although this threshold has varied over time.

These loans are characterized by higher interest rates, poor quality collateral, and less favorable terms in order to compensate for higher credit risk.  During the early to mid-2000s, many subprime loans were packaged into mortgage-backed securities (MBS) and ultimately defaulted, contributing to the financial crisis of 2007–2008.

Defining subprime risk
The term subprime refers to the credit quality of particular borrowers, who have weakened credit histories and a greater risk of loan default than prime borrowers. 
As people become economically active, records are created relating to their borrowing, earning, and lending histories. This is called a credit rating; although covered by privacy laws, the information is readily available to people with a need to know (in some countries, loan applications specifically allow the lender to access such records).
Subprime borrowers have credit ratings that might include:
 limited or no debt experience;
 limited or no possession of property assets that could be used as security (for the lender to sell in case of default);
 excessive debt
 the known income of the individual or family is unlikely to be enough to pay living expenses, plus interest and repayment;
 a history of late or sometimes missed payments;
 failures to pay debts completely (default debt);
 legal judgments such as "orders to pay" or bankruptcy (sometimes known in Britain as County Court judgments or CCJs).

Lenders' standards for determining risk categories may also consider the size of the proposed loan, and also take into account the way the loan and the repayment plan is structured, if it is a conventional repayment loan, a mortgage loan, an endowment mortgage, an interest-only loan, a standard repayment loan, an amortized loan, a credit card limit or some other arrangement. The originator is also taken into consideration. Because of this, it was possible for a loan to a borrower with "prime" characteristics (e.g. high credit score, low debt) to be classified as subprime.

Proponents of subprime lending maintain that the practice extends credit to people who would otherwise not have access to the credit market. Professor Harvey S. Rosen of Princeton University explained, "The main thing that innovations in the mortgage market have done over the past 30 years is to let in the excluded: the young, the discriminated against, the people without a lot of money in the bank to use for a down payment."

Student loans
In the United States the amount of student loan debt surpassed credit card debt, hitting the $1 trillion mark in 2012. However, that $1 trillion rapidly grew by 50% to $1.5 trillion as of 2018. In other countries such loans are underwritten by governments or sponsors. Many student loans are structured in special ways because of the difficulty of predicting students' future earnings. These structures may be in the form of soft loans, income-sensitive repayment loans, income-contingent repayment loans and so on. Because student loans provide repayment records for credit rating, and may also indicate their earning potential, student loan default can cause serious problems later in life as an individual wishes to make a substantial purchase on credit such as purchasing a vehicle or buying a house, since defaulters are likely to be classified as subprime, which means the loan may be refused  or more difficult to arrange and certainly more expensive than for someone with a perfect repayment record.

United States
Although there is no single, standard definition, in the United States subprime loans are usually classified as those where the borrower has a FICO score below 600. The term was popularized by the media during the subprime mortgage crisis or "credit crunch" of 2007. Those loans which do not meet Fannie Mae or Freddie Mac underwriting guidelines for prime mortgages are called "non-conforming" loans.  As such, they cannot be packaged into Fannie Mae or Freddie Mac MBS  and have less secondary market liquidity.

A borrower with a history of always making repayments on time and in full will get what is called an A grade paper loan. Borrowers with less-than-perfect credit scores might be rated as meriting an A-minus, B-paper, C-paper or D-paper loan, with interest payments progressively increased for less reliable payers to allow the company to share the risk of default equitably among all its borrowers. Between A-paper and subprime in risk is a grade called Alt-A. A-minus is related to Alt-A, with some lenders categorizing them the same, but A-minus is traditionally defined as mortgage borrowers with a FICO score of below 660 while Alt-A is traditionally defined as loans lacking full documentation or with alternative documentation of ability to repay .  The value of U.S. subprime mortgages was estimated at $1.3 trillion as of March 2007, with over 7.5 million first-lien subprime mortgages outstanding.

Canada

The sub-prime market did not take hold in Canada to the extent that it did in the U.S., where the vast majority of mortgages were originated by third parties and then packaged and sold to investors who often did not understand the associated risk.

Subprime crisis

The subprime mortgage crisis arose from "bundling" American subprime and American regular mortgages into mortgage-backed securities (MBSs) that were traditionally isolated from, and sold in a separate market from, prime loans.  These "bundles" of mixed (prime and subprime) mortgages were based on asset-backed securities so the probable rate of return looked very good (since subprime lenders pay higher premiums on loans secured against saleable real-estate, which was commonly assumed "could not fail"). Many subprime mortgages had a low initial interest rate for the first two or three years and those who defaulted were 'swapped' regularly at first, but finally, a bigger share of borrowers began to default in staggering numbers.  The inflated house-price bubble burst, property valuations plummeted and the real rate of return on investment could not be estimated, and so confidence in these instruments collapsed, and all less-than-prime mortgages were considered to be almost worthless toxic assets, regardless of their actual composition or performance.  Because of the "originate-to-distribute" model followed by many subprime mortgage originators, there was little monitoring of credit quality and little effort at remediation when these mortgages became troubled. Subprime loans as aggressive lending tools. Markets with a high concentration of aggressive lending facilities are at risk of a sharper fall in real estate prices after a negative shock to demand.

To avoid high initial mortgage payments, many subprime borrowers took out adjustable-rate mortgages (or ARMs) that give them a lower initial interest rate. But with potential annual adjustments of 2% or more per year, these loans can end up costing much more. So a $500,000 loan at a 4% interest rate for 30 years equates to a payment of about $2,400 a month. But the same loan at 10% for 27 years (after the adjustable period ends) equates to a payment of $4,220. A  6-percentage-point increase (from 4% to 10%) in the rate caused slightly more than a 75% increase in the payment. This is even more apparent when the lifetime cost of the loan is considered (though most people will want to refinance their loans periodically). The total cost of the above loan at 4% is $864,000, while the higher rate of 10% would incur a lifetime cost of $1,367,280.

See also
Amortization (business)
Collateral (finance)
Endowment mortgage
Graduated payments
Microcredit
Mortgage loan
Soft loan
Student loan default

References

External links

J F Bellod, "La Crisis Imposible"
Wolves Feeding On Bailout NPR.com
"The subprime wolves are back". Businessweek.
Workers Say Lender Ran 'Boiler Rooms' Michael Hudson and E. Scott Reckard, Los Angeles Times, February 4, 2005.

"Sub-Prime Trail of Deceit" The Cleveland Plain-Dealer investigation into the complicity of lenders in the Cleveland foreclosure mess. May 2008

"From Sub-Prime to Prime-Time - A Debate on the Current Financial Crisis" A panel of economists at Columbia University, School of International and Public Affairs, Feb 28, 2008. 
“What you ought to know about missold mortgages” Are mis-sold mortgages a problem for Banks and Brokers? June 8, 2018

Subprime mortgage crisis
Financial economics
Interest rates
Personal finance